Illyricvm is 2022 Croatian/Slovenian/Italian/Kosovar/Bosnian historical-adventure movie, co-written, and directed by Simon Bogojević-Narath.

Plot 
The film is set in 37 BC, when Liburnian shepard Volsus is taken by a Roman army unit, trying to collect taxes from seemingly conquered Illyrian tribes. Their task soon turns into a confrontation with the Illyrians.

Cast 

 Filip Križan as Volsus
 Labeat Bytyçi as Curtius
 Ylber Bardhi - Darmocus
 Robert Prebil - centurion Decimus Fabius
 Franjo Dijak - Lucius
 Adrian Pezdirc - Publican Marcus Plautius
 Edi Čelić – Leonidas
 Alan Katić – Quintus
 Elvis Bošnjak – Optio

Production 
The movie was filmed in Croatia, Italy and Bosnia and Herzegovina. Its production was preceded by a historical research as film director Simon Bogojević-Narath wanted to make a movie in Illyrian and Latin language which are nowadays extinct. In order to reconstruct the Illyrian language, professor Ranko Matasović of Faculty of Humanities and Social Sciences in Zagreb collaborated with the film authors. The authors also attempted to reconstruct the Illyrian clothes, weapons and culture as best as they could based on available scientific resources and in collaboration with Archaeological Museum in Zagreb.

References

External links 

 

2022 films
Cinema of Croatia
Croatian adventure films
Latin-language films